Neferhotep is an ancient Egyptian given name. Notable bearers were:

Neferhotep I, pharaoh of the 13th Dynasty
Neferhotep II, pharaoh of the 13th Dynasty, see Mersekhemre Ined
Neferhotep III, pharaoh of the 16th Dynasty
Neferhotep (scribe of the great enclosure) during the 13th Dynasty
Neferhotep, owner of Theban tomb TT6
Neferhotep "the Younger", owner of TT216 and grandson of the above 
Neferhotep, chief scribe of Amun, owner of TT49
Neferhotep, god's father of Amun-Ra, owner of TT50
The name also was an epithet of the lunar god Khonsu.